The International Australian Football Council (IAFC) was a body established in 1995 to govern the sport of Australian rules football internationally.  It was established by a small number of amateur football bodies.

The IAFC was established after the Arafura Games, held in Darwin, Northern Territory, Australia.

The Arafura Games were the first international games to have Australian rules football as a competition, rather than a demonstration sport.  Papua New Guinea won the Gold medal that year and retained it in subsequent games. The national delegations that fielded Australian rules football teams met and decided to form a central body to co-ordinate efforts to promote the game in their own nations. The IAFC was founded as a result of this meeting, the first president being Will McKenzie (New Zealand).

The IAFC helped organise the first Australian Football International Cup in Melbourne in 2002 which was won by Ireland.

As the primary rulemaker in Australia, the Australian Football League (AFL) refused to recognise the IAFC's role to govern the rules of the code internationally (given that it was primarily responsible for small amateur competitions).  As a response, the AFL brought on its own international game development initiatives and funding, limiting the scope and purpose of the IAFC to a promotional body. In line with these initiatives, many leagues around the world formally affiliated with the AFL and the AFL negotiated the unanimous voluntary dissolution (by member country vote) of the IAFC at the end of 2002 in a successful (in the eyes of most established international Leagues) attempt to gain the status of world governing body.

Some individual people, members of the IAFC, voted to continue under the IAFC banner as the "International Australian Football Confederation".  This body instigated the Multicultural Cup competitions in 2004 and 2005, involving expatriate communities living in Australia, of which Israel won the first, while Greece won the second.  It also played a role in organising the first EU Cup. This organisation eventually changed its name to Aussie Rules International, which functioned as a development and promotional body only.

By 2004, the AFL formed its own International Policy, the first of its kind since the formation of the IAFC and became formally recognised as the world governing body for the sport.

Background

In 1890, the first Australasian Football Council is formed in Melbourne under Australasian Rules to take control of all International Football matches (14 years before FIFA).  In 1905, an official Australasian Football Council was formed, after delegates from the North and South Islands of New Zealand became involved.  This body is in no way related to the International Australian Football Council, although the principle is the same.  By 1927, this body had changed its name to that of the Australian National Football Council owing to New Zealand no longer being represented.  The organisation disbanded some time due to the localisation of the Australian rules football code and the dominance of the Victorian Football League.

See also

AFL Commission
Australian Football International
List of Australian rules football leagues outside Australia

References

External links

 
History of Australian rules football
Sports organizations established in 1995